Giovanni Battistoni (7 January 1910 – 10 January 1978) was an Italian footballer who played as a midfielder.

External links
 

1910 births
1978 deaths
Italian footballers
Italy international footballers
Serie A players
Calcio Padova players
Inter Milan players
S.S.C. Bari players
U.C. Sampdoria players
Genoa C.F.C. players
Mantova 1911 players
Association football midfielders